Canyon–SRAM (stylised as Canyon//SRAM) is a professional women's cycling team that competes in elite women's road bicycle racing events, such as the UCI Women's World Tour. The title sponsors are Canyon Bicycles and SRAM Corporation. The team's clothing is provided by London-based Rapha. Ronny Lauke set the team up after the demise of his former team .

History
In September 2017, the team announced the signings of Alice Barnes, German road champion Lisa Klein and trainee Christa Riffel.

Team roster

Major wins

2016
 Overall Ladies Tour of Qatar, Trixi Worrack
Teams classification
EPZ Omloop van Borsele, Barbara Guarischi
Stage 1 Gracia–Orlová, Alena Amialiusik
Stage 1 Auensteiner–Radsporttage, Lisa Brennauer
Stage 4 Giro d'Italia Internazionale Femminile, Tiffany Cromwell
 Overall Internationale Thüringen Rundfahrt der Frauen, Elena Cecchini
Stage 5 Boels Rental Ladies Tour, Lisa Brennauer
2017
 Youth classification Santos Women's Tour, Alexis Ryan
 Sprints classification Healthy Ageing Tour, Barbara Guarischi
Stage 3, Lisa Brennauer
Stage 3 Giro d'Italia Femminile, Hannah Barnes
 Overall Thüringen Rundfahrt der Frauen, Lisa Brennauer
 German rider classification, Lisa Brennauer
Teams classification
Prologue, Lisa Brennauer
 Points classification Holland Ladies Tour, Lisa Brennauer
 Mountain classification, Alexis Ryan
Stage 4, Lisa Brennauer
 Combativity classification, Stage 5, Alexis Ryan
2018
 Overall Semana Ciclista Valenciana, Hannah Barnes
Team classification
Stages 1 & 4, Hannah Barnes
Drentse Acht van Westerveld, Alexis Ryan
Trofeo Alfredo Binda-Comune di Cittiglio, Katarzyna Niewiadoma
 Youth classification Healthy Ageing Tour, Lisa Klein
Prologue Festival Elsy Jacobs, Lisa Klein
Stage 2 Thüringen Rundfahrt der Frauen, Elena Cecchini
Stage 6 Thüringen Rundfahrt der Frauen, Alice Barnes
 Youth classification BeNe Ladies Tour, Lisa Klein 
Stage 2b (ITT), Trixi Worrack
 Overall Tour Cycliste Féminin International de l'Ardèche, Katarzyna Niewiadoma
 Mountains classification, Katarzyna Niewiadoma
 Combination classification, Katarzyna Niewiadoma
Stage 1, Alexis Ryan
Stage 5, Katarzyna Niewiadoma
UCI Road World Championships – Women's team time trial
2019
 Overall Healthy Ageing Tour, Lisa Klein 
 Youth classification Vuelta a Burgos Feminas, Ella Harris
Team classification Tour of California
 Sprints classification Emakumeen Euskal Bira, Tanja Erath
Stage 4 Thüringen Rundfahrt der Frauen, Lisa Klein 
 Mountains classification The Women's Tour, Katarzyna Niewiadoma
 Overall BeNe Ladies Tour, Lisa Klein
Team classification Colorado Classic
Stage 3 Boels Ladies Tour, Lisa Klein
2021
Stage 3 Setmana Ciclista Valenciana, Alice Barnes
Stage 1 Tour de Suisse Women, Elise Chabbey
Stage 2 Belgium Tour. Alena Amialiusik
 Overall BeNe Ladies Tour
Stage 2b (ITT) 
2022
 Points classification Bloeizone Fryslân Tour, Alice Barnes
 Sprints classification, Shari Bossuyt
 Youth classification, Shari Bossuyt
 Mountains classification Itzulia Women, Elise Chabbey
Durango-Durango Emakumeen Saria, Pauliena Rooijakkers

National champions

2016
 Germany Time Trial, Trixi Worrack
 Germany Road Race, Mieke Kröger
 British Road Race, Hannah Barnes
2017
 Germany Time Trial, Trixi Worrack
 France MTB (XCO), Pauline Ferrand-Prévot
2018
 France Cyclo-cross, Pauline Ferrand-Prévot
 Belarus Time Trial, Alena Amialiusik
 British Time Trial, Hannah Barnes
 Belarus Road Race, Alena Amialiusik
 Italy Time Trial, Elena Cecchini
 Germany Omnium, Lisa Klein
2019 
 Israel Time Trial, Rotem Gafinovitz
 Israel Road Race, Omer Shapira
 British Time Trial, Alice Barnes
 Germany Time Trial, Lisa Klein
 European U23 Time Trial, Hannah Ludwig
2020
 New Zealand U23 Time Trial, Ella Harris
 Israel Time Trial, Omer Shapira
 Israel Road Race, Omer Shapira
2021
 USA Time Trial, Chloé Dygert
 Israel Road Race, Omer Shapira

References

External links

Cycling teams based in Germany
UCI Women's Teams
Cycling teams established in 2016
2016 establishments in Germany